Walter Knaller (born 24 October 1957) is an Austrian football striker and later manager.

References

1957 births
Living people
Austrian footballers
FC St. Veit players
FC Admira Wacker Mödling players
FC Blau-Weiß Linz players
Kremser SC players
Austrian Football Bundesliga players
Association football forwards
Austrian football managers
FC Blau-Weiß Linz managers
FC Admira Wacker Mödling managers
FC Kärnten managers
People from Feldkirchen District
Footballers from Carinthia (state)